The  Irabere estuary and Iliomar forest Important Bird Area  is a tract of land in East Timor, a country occupying the eastern end of the island of Timor in the Lesser Sunda Islands of Wallacea.

Description
The 16,554 ha  IBA lies on the border between the districts of Viqueque to the west and Lautém to the east. In elevation it ranges from sea level to about 500 m. It contains the area around the Irabere River estuary, which is vegetated by degraded semi-evergreen forest on alluvial soils, Casuarina forest along the river and agricultural land. It extends to encompass tropical dry forest and moist deciduous forest, with scattered patches of cultivation, in the subdistrict of Iliomar from east of the river for about 20 km inland.

Birds
The site has been identified by BirdLife International as an Important Bird Area because it support populations of bar-necked cuckoo-doves, pink-headed imperial pigeons, yellow-crested cockatoos, jonquil parrots, streak-breasted honeyeaters, Timor friarbirds, plain gerygones, fawn-breasted whistlers, olive-brown orioles, Timor stubtails, blue-cheeked flowerpeckers and flame-breasted sunbirds.

See also
 List of Important Bird Areas in East Timor

References

Lautém Municipality
Viqueque Municipality
Important Bird Areas of East Timor